The 1899 Italian Football Championship season was won by Genoa.

Qualifications

Liguria
Genoa waited for their opponents, a team from near Sampierdarena, on March 27, but this team retired.

Piemonte
Played April 2

|}
Played April 9 

|}

Final
Played April 16

|}

References and sources
Almanacco Illustrato del Calcio - La Storia 1898-2004, Panini Edizioni, Modena, September 2005

 
1899
1898–99 in European association football leagues
1898–99 in Italian football